The Piper PA-42 Cheyenne is a turboprop aircraft built by Piper Aircraft. The PA-42 Cheyenne is a larger development of the earlier PA-31T Cheyennes I and II (which are, in turn, turboprop developments of the PA-31 Navajo).

History

Cheyenne III

The PA-42 Cheyenne III was announced in September 1977. The first production Cheyenne III flew for the first time on May 18, 1979, and FAA certification was granted in early 1980. Compared with the Cheyenne II, the PA-42-720 was about 1 m (3 ft) longer, was powered by 537 kW (720-shp) PT6A-41 turboprops and introduced a T-tail, the most obvious external difference between the PA-31T and PA-42, as well as the most significant change to the series. Deliveries of production Cheyenne IIIs began on June 30, 1980.

Cheyenne 400

In the late 1970s, Piper avoided developing a clean-sheet light business jet to compete with the Cessna Citation I and upgraded its PT6As from  Honeywell TPE331-14s. The PA-42-1000 Cheyenne IV was certified in 1984, 44 were built until 1991 and 37 remain in service in 2018.

Due to its top speed over 400 mph, it was renamed the Cheyenne 400LS when Lear Siegler owned Piper, then the Cheyenne 400.

Flat rated to ISA+37, the turboprops maintain their power to almost . Its empennage was enlarged for stability at higher speeds and altitudes, and its fuselage was strengthened.

It can operate out of  runways with a  minimum control speed, similar to a King Air 300; it can operate from much shorter hot and high runways than a Citation I and landing is shortened by the rotating speedbrake effect of the propellers in beta pitch. It can hold  of fuel plus two passengers with baggage, while each extra passenger costs  of range. It has a 98% dispatch reliability and its cabin is quieter than a King Air.

The 400LS made aviation history on 16 April 1985 by setting two new time-to-climb records for its class (C-1e Group 2, 3000m and 9,000m) and shattering two time-to-climb records for all turboprop classes (6,000m and 12,000m): with retired United States Air Force Brigadier General Chuck Yeager at the helm of N400PS (with co-pilot Renald "Dav" Davenport flying right-seat), the aircraft departed from Portland-Hillsboro Airport's Runway 31L, immediately reached a 5,959-foot-per-minute climbout and achieved its 3,000m record in 1 minute, 47.6 seconds; the 6,000m record in 3 minutes, 42.0 seconds; its 9,000m record at 6 minutes, 34.6 seconds; the 12,000m record at 11 minutes, 8.3 seconds (time-to-altitude records were captured by on-board video camera aimed at relevant panel gauges, timed with superimposed timer; also verified by Hillsboro Airport tower personnel via radar, using encoded altimeter data transmitted from aircraft to tower via transponder). Other records later set by the 400LS, again piloted by Yeager in 400LS N4118Y (later reregistered as N46HL) for the C-1e Group 2 class, were: Miami-to-Boston, Miami-to-New York City, San Francisco-to-Charleston, West Virginia, San Francisco-to-Cincinnati, San Francisco-to-Los Angeles, New York City-to-Paris, Washington, DC-to-Paris and Gander-Paris.

The 400LS has 100-hour inspection intervals, engine midlife inspections are due at 1,500 hours and overhauls come at 3,000 hours. The fuselage is limited to a 15,000-hour life, while the wing and empennage have 20,000-hour life limits.

Variants 
 Cheyenne III, model PA-42, equipped with Pratt & Whitney Canada PT6-41 engines
 Cheyenne IIIA, model PA-42-720, equipped with PT6A-61 engines.
 Cheyenne IV, model PA-42-1000, later the Cheyenne 400LS, and then Cheyenne 400. This is the largest aircraft ever made by Piper, with 43 built. Powered by  Garrett TPE-331 engines, and four-blade props.
 Customs High Endurance Tracker (CHET), special surveillance version of the Cheyenne III, fitted with an AN/APG-66 radar and a ventral FLIR; nine built for the U.S. Customs Service.

Specifications

Operators
The aircraft is operated by private individuals, companies and executive charter operators. A number of companies also use the aircraft as part of fractional ownership programs.

See also

References

External links

Piper PA-42 Cheyenne 400LS review
Piper Aircraft News Release: Extended Range for Cheyenne IIIs (1980)
Piper Aircraft News Release: Cheyenne III Deliveries Underway (1980)

Cheyenne III
1970s United States business aircraft
Low-wing aircraft
Twin-turboprop tractor aircraft
T-tail aircraft
Aircraft first flown in 1979